The Kennicott Cabin is a log house located at State Highway 69, north of Westcliffe, Colorado. The cabin was constructed in 1869 by Frank Kennicott, one of the first settlers in the Wet Mountain Valley. The cabin's design reflects cabin construction methods popular in the Eastern United States rather than common Western designs, possibly because Kennicott was from Illinois. In addition, the cabin is an unusual example of a two-story log cabin.

The cabin was added to the National Register of Historic Places on February 14, 1997.

References

External links

Houses on the National Register of Historic Places in Colorado
Houses completed in 1869
Houses in Custer County, Colorado
Log cabins in the United States
1869 establishments in Colorado Territory
National Register of Historic Places in Custer County, Colorado
Log buildings and structures on the National Register of Historic Places in Colorado